The following is a partial list of characters from Diana Gabaldon's  Outlander series as first introduced, beginning with the 1991 novel Outlander. The story focuses on 20th century nurse Claire Randall, who time travels to 18th-century Scotland and finds adventure and romance with the dashing Jamie Fraser. A mix of several genres, the series features elements of historical fiction, romance, adventure, mystery and science fiction/fantasy. In August 2014, the US-based cable channel Starz debuted a TV series adaptation based on the novels.

Main characters

Supporting characters

Introduced in Outlander (1991)

Introduced in Dragonfly in Amber (1992)

Introduced in Voyager (1993)

Introduced in Drums of Autumn (1996)

Introduced in The Fiery Cross (2001)

Introduced in A Breath of Snow and Ashes (2005)

Introduced in An Echo in the Bone (2009)

Introduced in Written in My Own Heart's Blood (2014)

Appearances (TV series)
  = Main cast (credited) 
  = Recurring cast (3+)
  = Guest cast (1-2)

Main cast
The following actors have been credited in the opening titles of the television series.

Recurring cast
The following actors have been credited in at least three episodes within a season of the television series. Only named characters are listed.

Guest cast
The following actors have been credited in one or two episodes within a season of the television series. Only named characters are listed.

Season 1

 Kathryn Howden as Mrs. Baird
 Prentis Hancock as Uncle Lamb
 Donald Gillies as William Talbot
 Donald Sinclair as Fingal Duncan
 Kenny Lindsay as Clyde MacKenzie
 David MacKenzie as Kyle
 Artair Donald as Malcolm
 Muireann Kelly as Dolina
 Tim McInnerny as Father Bain
 Gillebride MacMillan as Gwyllyn the Bard
 John Sessions as Arthur Duncan
 Lynsey-Anne Moffat as Mrs. Baxter
 David McKay as Niall Drummond
 Nicola Clark as Shona MacNeill
 Bryan Larkin as Geordie
 Diana Gabaldon as Iona MacTavish
 Valerie Edmond as Donalda Gilchrist
 Tam Dean Burn as Alastair
 Mark Kydd as Marcus
 Linda Jane Devlin as Morag
 Belle Jones as Shirley
 Kate Donnelly as Muriel
 Robert Williamson as Torcall Iverson
 Martin Burns as Beathan Young
 John Heffernan as Brigadier General Lord Oliver Thomas
 Ian Dunn as Captain Yates
 Andrew Whipp as Brian Fraser
 Matthew Steer as Lieutenant Hughes
 Edmund Digby-Jones as Corporal Hawkins
 Kevin Mains as Andrew Gow
 Frank Gilhooley as Torin
 Hilary MacLean as Edina
 Rachel McReath as Mairi
 Nina Gilhooly as Isabella
 John Wark as Detective Collins
 Alan McHugh as Sergeant McKinney
 Olivia Morgan as Sally
 James Groom as Harry
 Nicholas Aaron as Arnold
 Gerry McLaughlin as Constable Boyle
 Lochlann O'Mearain as Horrocks
 Graeme McKnight as Private McGinnis
 James Young as Alexander MacDonald
 Andrew Rothney as Neil MacDonald
 Paul Tinto as Rob MacDonald
 Kern Falconer as Kilgore
 Mark McDonnell as Watt
 Johnny Austin as John Macrae
 Mark Prendergast as Alastair Duffie
 Kim Allan as Robena Donaldson
 Francis Magee as Crenshaw
 Richard Jack as Ronald MacNab
 Matthew Douglas as Corporal Dawson
 Richard Cant as Collins
 Paul Charlton as Duncan
 Naomi Neilson as Mabel
 David Leith as Robert
 Martin Brody as Seoirse Ward
 Mark Jeary as Private Edward Richards
 Sally Howitt as Kyrie
 Richard Ashton as Marley
 Frazer Hines as Sir Fletcher Gordon
 Brian McCardie as Sir Marcus MacRannoch
 Gary Lind as Absalom
 Ian Hanmore as Father Anselm
 Sandy Grierson as Brother Paul

Season 2

 Sandy Welch as Dr. Edwards
 Margaux Châtelier as Annalise de Marillac
 Audrey Brisson as Sister Angelique
 Gaia Weiss as Countess St. Germain
 Howard Corlett as Jules de Rohan 
 Siôn Tudor Owen as Silas Hawkins
 Ian Bustard as Vicomte Marigny
 Andrea Dolente as Danton
 Herbert Forthuber as General D'Arbanville
 Paul Lacoux as Monsignor Flèche
 Scarlett Mack as Toinette
 Ilario Calvo as Father Laurentin
 Maureen Beattie as Maisri
 James Parris as Simon Fraser
 Tyler Collins as Private Lucas
 Billy Griffin, Jr. as Corporal Grant
 Alex Hope as Richard Anderson
 Alice McMillan as Molly Cockburn
 Bridget McCann as Alice McMurdo
 Sarah Higgins as Allina Clerk
 Tom Cox as Colonel James Gardner
 Robert Curtis as Lieutenant Barnes
 Brendan Patricks as Captain Claremont
 Sean Hay as Donald Cameron of Lochiel
 James Robinson as Greg Edgars
 Carol Ann Crawford as Mrs. Berrow
 Charles Jamieson as Mr. Berrow

Season 3

 Sam Hoare as Harold "Hal" Grey, Earl of Melton
 Oliver Tilney as Lieutenant Wallace
 Colin Stinton as Dean Jackson
 Kimberley Nixon as Millie Nelson
 Roger Ringrose as Dr. Thorne
 Rory Barraclough as Frederick MacBean
 Ryan Ralph Gerrard as Giles McMartin
 Greg Esplin as Hamish
 Geoff McGivern as Dr. Simms
 Emma Campbell-Jones as Mary MacNab
 Rufus Wright as Captain Samuel Lewis
 Will Richards as Private Jenkins
 Ryan Fletcher as Corporal MacGregor
 Martin Delaney as Jerry Nelson
 Martin Docherty as Mackay
 Murray McArthur as Duncan Kerr
 Sarah MacRae as Sandy Travers
 Shane Quigley Murphy as Patrick
 Neil Ashton as Corporal Brame
 Hannah James as Lady Geneva Dunsany
 Tanya Reynolds as Lady Isobel Dunsany
 Rupert Vansittart as Lord William Dunsany
 Beth Goddard as Lady Louisa Dunsany
 James Cameron Stewart as Lord Ellesmere
 Fiona Francis as Lady Grozier
 Greg Powrie as John Burton
 Richard Addison as Mr. Evans
 Ali Craig as Dorsey
 Mitchell Mullen as Dean Tramble
 Douglas Reith as Professor Brown
 Cyrielle Debreuil as Jeanne LeGrand
 Lorn Macdonald as Geordie
 Ian Conningham as Barton
 Paul Brightwell as Sir Percival Turner
 Shannon Swan as Senga
 Jane MacFarlane as Pauline
 Keira Lucchesi as Dorcas
 Kirsty Strain as Peggy
 Kimberly Sinclair as Molly
 Ian Reddington as Harry Tompkins
 Zoe Barker as Brighid
 Gary French as Mr. Haugh
 Robin B. Smith as McDaniel
 Cora Tsang as Janet Murray
 Albie Marber as Elias Pound
 Nigel Betts as Aloysius Murphy
 Karl Thaning as First Mate Warren
 Gustav Gerdener as Seaman Jones
 Lawrence Joffe as Bernard Cosworth
 Nathan Lynn as Joe Howard
 Chanelle De Jager as Annekje Johansen
 Matt Newman as Mr. Overholt
 Nick Fletcher as Father Fogden
 Vivi Lepori as Mamacita
 James McAnerney as Kenneth MacIver
 Muireann Kelly as Rosie MacIver
 Apolinhalo Antonio as Hercules
 Joel Rosenblatt as Henry
 Thapelo Sebogodi as Temeraire
 Adrian Collins as Diogo
 Victor Kalambai as Abeeku
 Laudo Liebenberg as Erasmo
 Patrick Lavisa as Atlas
 Brett Williams as Mr. Oliver
 Jessica Walsh as Lucille Oliver
 Nandi Horak as Mrs. Oliver

Season 4

 Rainer Sellien as Baron Penzler
 Ainsley Jordan as Judith Wylie
 Graeme Stirling as Mr. Stanhope
 Geoffrey Newland as Mr. Lillington
 Peter Collins as Sergeant Heyns
 James Ringer Beck as Private Griswold
 James Barriscale as Farquard Campbell
 Craig McGinlay as MacNeill
 Lee Boardman as Lieutenant Wolff
 Brian Ferguson as Lucius Gordon
 Cameron Jack as Overseer Byrnes
 Gerry Kielty as Kyle
 Jerome Holder as Rufus
 Joel Okocha as Thomas
 Ciaron Kelly as Ernie
 Trevor Carroll as Ta'wineonawira "Otter Tooth"
 Colin Michael Carmichael as Peter
 Flint Eagle as Tskili Yona
 Simona Brown as Gayle
 Will Strongheart as Tawodi
 Wesley French as Chief Nawohali
 Crystle Lightning as Giduhwa
 Urs Rechn as Gerhard Mueller
 Nicola Ransom as Rosewitha Mueller
 David Christopher Roth as Tommy Mueller
 Marie Hacke as Petronella Mueller
 Hilary Lyon as Patty Baird
 Stuart McQuarrie as Tim Baird
 Laura Ferries as Hester
 Samuel Pashby as Danny Graham
 Albert Welling as Pastor Gottfried
 Caoimhe Clough as Isobeail
 Alec Newman as Joseph Wemyss
 Caitlin Ward as Marion
 Edwin Flay as John Gillette
 Simon Harrison as George Washington
 Elizabeth Appleby as Martha Washington
 Nolan Willis as Tom
 Jack Reid as John Frohock
 John Mackie as Malachi Fyke
 Tom Hardwicke as Gotarzes
 Tim Barrow as Vardanes
 Kieran Baker as Lysias
 Andrew McIntosh as Peter
 James MacKenzie as Caleb
 Andrew Steele as Judge Alderdyce
 Stuart McMillan as Captain McPeters
 Louise Oliver as Miss Forbes
 Maggie Macleod as Mrs. Alderdyce
 Tim Chipping as Sergeant Southworth
 Mat Urey as Sergeant Scott
 Ryan Havelin as Corporal Benton

Season 5

 Mark Cox as Reverend Caldwell
 Anita Vettesse as Margaret Chisholm
 Luke Roskell as Lee Withers
 Paul Kennedy as Herman Husband
 Callum Coates as John Evans
 James Doherty as Charles Turnbull
 Andy Apollo as Mr. Marsden
 Nicola Jo Cully as Nonie Farrish
 Paul Cassidy as Leith Farrish
 Carole Anders as Ruth Aberfeldy
 Anja Karmanski as Ute McGillivray
 Bronwyn James as Fanny Beardsley
 Christopher Fairbank as Aaron Beardsley
 Susan Coyle as Joan Findlay
 Anna Burnett as Alicia Brown
 Sarah Belcher as Meg Brown
 Muireann Brown as Lucinda Brown
 Connor McIndoe as Hiram Brown
 Stephen McCole as Graham Menzies
 Stephen Mitchell as Father Beggs
 Samantha Dakin as Nurse Atwell
 James Gaddas as Judge Martin Atticus
 Stephen Clyde as Robert Barlow
 Clive Hayward as Quincy Arbuckle
 Sharon Young as Mrs. Laurence
 Helen McAlpine as Mrs. Shepherd
 Christopher Bowen as Hector Cameron
 Rosie Graham as Morna Cameron
 Miles Richardson as Colonel Chadwick
 Matthew Cottle as Hubert Sherston
 Charlotte Asprey as Phoebe Sherston
 Jack Stewart as Charles Morgan
 Thomas Mugglestone as Henry Jones
 Leah Shine as Eppie
 Lorraine McIntosh as Mrs. Sylvie
 Peter Warnock as Capitano Howard
 Richard Gadd as Duff
 Megan McGuire as Mabel
 Brennan Martin as Wendigo Donner
 Gerald Tyler as Arvin Hodgepile
 Michael Monroe as Cuddy Brown
 Alexis Rodney as Tebbe
 Calum Barbour as Garrick
 Andrew John Tait as Hanlon
 Hayley Doherty as Rose Brown

Season 6

 Nathan Byrne as James McCready
 Brian Pettifer as Old Charlie
 Dyfan Dwyfor as Private Hughes
 Solly McLeod as Private Lambie
 Nebli Basani as Alastair McLeod
 Richard Glaves as Captain Thornton
 Anne Kidd as Grannie Wilson
 David Gant as The Sin Eater
 Blair Lamora as Walela
 Barbara Patrick as Selu
 Sinead Macinnes as Hortense MacNeill
 Morgan Holmstrom as Wahionhaweh
 Marty Wildman as Tehhonahtake
 Michael Geary as Scotchee Cameron
 Shauna Macdonald as Flora MacDonald
 Russell Watters as Allan MacDonald
 James Weber Brown as Cornelius Harnett
 Freddie Stevenson as Ainsley Beeston
 Eugene O'Hare as Governor Josiah Martin
 Dominic Wolf as Captain Chapman
 David Mahoney as Fogarty Simms
 Adam Kotz as Sheriff Tolliver
 Michael Cooke as Ezra
 Mark Rannoch as Jack
 Hunter Bishop as Amon Oakes
 Chris Dennis as Curtis Brown
 Tim Faraday as Jacoby
 Katie Redford as Margit

Notes

References

External links 
 
 

Characters
Outlander